Rafael Guzmán Hernández (9 April 1986 – 18 October 2011) was a Mexican professional boxer. Guzmán is the former WBC FECARBOX Super Featherweight, WBC Mundo Hispano, and WBC FECARBOX Lightweight Champion.

Early life
Guzmán started his amateur boxing career at age ten. He's the son of a former professional boxer and was trained by his father throughout his boxing career.

Professional career
Guzmán knocked out Ernesto González to win the WBC FECARBOX lightweight title and then he won the WBC Mundo Hispano lightweight title by stopping the veteran Jorge Martínez.

On January 24, 2009 Guzmán upset contender Isaac Bejarano to win the WBC FECARBOX super featherweight title. He won his third title in front of his hometown at the Coliseo Olimpico de la UG in Guadalajara, Jalisco, Mexico.

In June 2011, Guzmán lost to an undefeated Mikey Garcia on HBO's undercard of Julio César Chávez, Jr. vs. Sebastian Zbik.

Death
On October 18, 2011 Guzmán was shot eight times before dying in his hometown of Guadalajara, Jalisco. Reports are that he attempted to escape after the initial shots but was unable to advance more than 100 meters.

In a case of mistaken identity, Rafael had survived a previous attack when on his way to see the birth of his fourth child his vehicle was shot eleven times. With one bullet going through him and another staying lodged in his forearm through the remainder of his boxing career.

References

External links

1986 births
2011 deaths
Boxers from Jalisco
Sportspeople from Guadalajara, Jalisco
Lightweight boxers
Super-featherweight boxers
Featherweight boxers
Male murder victims
Mexican male boxers
Mexican murder victims
Deaths by firearm in Mexico